Stryphnodendron is a genus of flowering plant in the family Fabaceae. It belongs to the mimosoid clade of the subfamily Caesalpinioideae.

Species
Stryphnodendron comprises the following species:
 Stryphnodendron adstringens
 Stryphnodendron coriaceum
 Stryphnodendron guianense
 Stryphnodendron harbesonii
 Stryphnodendron microstachyum
 Stryphnodendron moricolor
 Stryphnodendron obovatum
 Stryphnodendron polystachyum
 Stryphnodendron porcatum
 Stryphnodendron pulcherrimum
 Stryphnodendron racemiferum

References

External links

 
Fabaceae genera
Taxonomy articles created by Polbot